First Congregational Church and Parsonage may refer to:
 First Congregational Church and Parsonage (Kingman, Arizona), listed on the NRHP in Arizona
 First Congregational Church and Parsonage (Kittery, Maine), listed on the NRHP in Maine